The Haine is a river in southern Belgium (Hainaut) and northern France (Nord), right tributary of the river Scheldt. The Haine gave its name to the County of Hainaut, and the present province of Hainaut. Its source is in Anderlues, Belgium. As the western end of the sillon industriel, Wallonia's industrial backbone, it flows through the heavily industrialized Borinage region, notably the towns La Louvière, Mons and Saint-Ghislain. A few kilometres after crossing the border to France, the Haine flows into the Scheldt in Condé-sur-l'Escaut.

References

External links
Contrat Rivière Haine

Rivers of Belgium
Rivers of France
International rivers of Europe
Rivers of Hauts-de-France
Rivers of Hainaut (province)
Rivers of Nord (French department)